Guadalupe Valdez San Pedro (b. Mexico City, 22 September 1957) is a Dominican Republic politician. She was national deputy from 2010 to 2016.

Early life
Valdez was born in Mexico City to Nicolás Quírico Valdez, a Dominican labor activist exiled in Mexico, and Lucía San Pedro, a Mexican woman. Her father was considered a communist and was expelled from Mexico and had to seek asylum in the USSR. Valdez was raised in her maternal grandmother's home. After the fall of Rafael Trujillo’s dictatorship in 1961, Lucía San Pedro moved to Santo Domingo with her children, including Guadalupe, to rejoin her husband.

Political beginnings

Legislative career
In 2010, Valdez was elected to the Chamber of Deputies of the Dominican Republic.

Family and personal life

References 

Living people
1957 births
Dominican Republic people of Mexican descent
Mexican people of Dominican Republic descent
People from Mexico City
Alliance for Democracy (Dominican Republic) politicians
Members of the Chamber of Deputies of the Dominican Republic
Women members of the Congress of the Dominican Republic
21st-century Dominican Republic women politicians
21st-century Dominican Republic politicians